Predrag Golubović (25 June 1935 – 18 July 1994) was a Serbian film director and screenwriter. He directed more than 25 films between 1964 and 1986. His 1981 film Peacetime in Paris was entered into the 12th Moscow International Film Festival where it won a Special Prize. He had one son,  film director Srdan Golubović.

Selected filmography
 Peacetime in Paris (1981)

References

External links

1935 births
1994 deaths
Serbian film directors
Serbian screenwriters
Male screenwriters
Film people from Sarajevo
Serbs of Bosnia and Herzegovina
20th-century screenwriters